Rick Friedberg (born March 11, 1944) is an American film and television director, screenwriter and producer, best known for his work with Leslie Nielsen. He is also the author of Hollywood War Stories, How to Survive in the Trenches, a memoir/advice guide on the film industry.

Career 
Friedberg made his feature film debut in 1980 with the comedy Pray TV starring Dabney Coleman, followed by 1983's Off the Wall. He would direct television episodes for The Twilight Zone, New Monkees and CityKids. When Friedberg made the comic instruction video Bad Golf Made Easier with Leslie Nielsen, he showed his son Jason Friedberg's script to him, which was parodying James Bond movies and other action films. Nielsen approved, and this led to 1996's Spy Hard. The film eventually grossed $26 million against a production budget of $18 million.

Through the 2000s and 2010s, Friedberg served as second unit director on series like CSI: Miami and Scorpion, as well as director/field producer on The Real Housewives of Orange County.

Filmography

Feature Film

Television

Direct-To-Video

Music Videos
Hot for Teacher
Summertime Girls
Blind in Texas
Wild Child
|}

References

External links 

Living people
American film directors
American male screenwriters
Comedy film directors
English-language film directors
1944 births